The 1996 IPSC Handgun World Shoot XI held in Brasilia, Brazil was the 11th IPSC Handgun World Shoot. The match had 609 competitors, teams from 31 nations and consisted of 35 stages. The Open division was won by Todd Jarrett, while the Standard division once again was won by Ted Bonnet of USA. Todd Jarret from Virginia had established himself as a major player before the event, having placed in the top four of the US Nationals every year since 1990 except one. According to himself he had trained well before the World Shoot in Brazil, and was quoted saying "It's really amazing, the harder I work, the luckier I get."

Rulebook used 
The 12th edition of the Rules of International Practical Shooting Confederation was used under the championship and one of the major changes compared to the current rules are the team rules where national team consisted of a maximum of six members. Ladies teams consisted of a maximum four members.

Champions

Open 
The Open division had the largest match participation with 398 competitors (65.4 %), 

Individual

Teams

Modified 
The Modified division had 11 competitors.

Individual

Standard 
The Standard division had the second largest match participation with 200 competitors (32.8 %), 

Individual

Teams

See also 
IPSC Rifle World Shoots
IPSC Shotgun World Shoot
IPSC Action Air World Shoot

References

Match Results - 1996 Handgun World Shoot, Brazil - USPSA Frontsight 3. 1997, page 14

1996
1996 in shooting sports
Shooting competitions in Brazil
1996 in Brazilian sport
International sports competitions hosted by Brazil